The 2014 Oregon State Beavers football team represented Oregon State University during the 2014 NCAA Division I FBS football season. The team was led by head coach Mike Riley, in his 12th straight season  and 14th overall. Home games were played on campus at Reser Stadium in Corvallis and were a member of the North Division of the Pac-12 Conference. They finished the season 5–7, 2–7 in Pac-12 play to finish in a tie for fifth place in the North Division.

On December 4, head coach Mike Riley resigned to take the same position at Nebraska.

Schedule

Source:

Roster
QB Sean Mannion, Sr.

Game summaries

Portland State

Hawaii

San Diego State

USC

Colorado

Utah

Stanford

California

Washington State

Arizona State

Washington

Oregon

References

Oregon State
Oregon State Beavers football seasons
Oregon State Beavers football